Kaos is the debut solo studio album by Latin hip hop artist Ana Tijoux, released in 2007 through Oveja Negra.

Track listing

References

2007 albums
Ana Tijoux albums